George Welshman Owens (August 29, 1786 – March 2, 1856) was a United States Representative and lawyer from Georgia.

Early life
Born in Savannah, Georgia, in 1786, Owens attended school in Harrow, England, and graduated from the University of Cambridge. After studying law in the office of Mr. Chitty in London, Owens returned to Savannah, gained admittance to the state bar and practiced law.

Political career
Owens was elected as a Jacksonian Representative from Georgia to the 24th United States Congress and won reelection as a Democrat to the 25th Congress, serving from March 4, 1835, until March 3, 1839. After his congressional service, Owens returned to practicing law and died in Savannah on March 2, 1856. He was buried in Laurel Grove Cemetery in that same city.

References
 

1786 births
1856 deaths
People from Savannah, Georgia
American people of Welsh descent
Jacksonian members of the United States House of Representatives from Georgia (U.S. state)
Democratic Party members of the United States House of Representatives from Georgia (U.S. state)
Mayors of Savannah, Georgia
American slave owners
Georgia (U.S. state) lawyers
Alumni of the University of Cambridge